Arkansas's 2010 general elections were held November 2, 2010.  Primaries were held May 18, 2010 and runoffs, if necessary, were held November 23, 2010.  Arkansas elected seven constitutional officers, 17 of 35 state senate seats, all 100 house seats and 28 district prosecuting attorneys, and voted on one constitutional amendment and one referred question.  Non-partisan judicial elections were held the same day as the party primaries for four Supreme Court justices, four appeals circuit court judges, and eight district court judges.

Federal

United States Senate

Incumbent Democratic U.S. Senator Blanche Lincoln ran unsuccessfully for re-election against Republican John Boozman. Arkansas had previously only elected one Republican senator since the Reconstruction, who was defeated after his first term in 2002 by Mark Pryor. Lincoln faced Lieutenant Governor Bill Halter and narrowly won the primary contest.

Democratic primary
The Democratic primary was held on May 18, 2010, with early voting from May 3–17. As no candidate received 50 percent of the vote, a runoff election was held on June 8, with early voting from June 1–7.

Candidates
Bill Halter, Lieutenant Governor
Blanche Lincoln, incumbent senator
D.C. Morrison, businessman from Little Rock

Results

Republican primary
The Republican primary was held on May 18, 2010, with early voting from May 3–17.

Candidates
Randy Alexander, University of Arkansas Housing Director; Vice Chair, Washington County Tea Party
Gilbert Baker, state senator
John Boozman, U.S. Representative
Curtis Coleman, businessman
Kim Hendren, State Senate Minority Leader
Jim Holt, former state senator and Lincoln's 2004 opponent
Fred Ramey, real estate investment company owner
Conrad Reynolds, retired Army colonel

Results

United States Senate election results

United States House

All four of Arkansas's seats in the United States House of Representatives were up for election in 2010.  Only one of the four incumbents sought re-election, Democrat Mike Ross of District 4.

Results U.S. Congress District 01

This is an open seat, as Democratic incumbent Marion Berry was retiring. Berry has always been reelected in this district by a wide margin since his first reelection campaign in 1998, and was unopposed in 2008. The district is very Republican (giving only 38% to Obama) on a national level despite a long history of electing Democrats to local and state level offices.

Results U.S. Congress District 02

This district was represented by seven term Democrat Vic Snyder who was unchallenged in 2008 and received 70% of the vote. Snyder announced that he would retire in 2010, reportedly after polls showed him trailing Republican Tim Griffin.

Results U.S. Congress District 03

This district was represented by Republican John Boozman. Boozman ran for the U.S. Senate, against Blanche Lincoln.  The district (comprising the northwest part of the state) has been held by the GOP since 1966.

Results U.S. Congress District 04

State

Constitutional Officers

Governor

Democratic Party
Mike Beebe, incumbent Governor

Republican Party
Jim Keet, former state representative and state senator from Pulaski County

Green Party
Jim Lendall, former state representative and 2006 nominee

Write-in
Billy Roper, Tea Party write-in candidate controversial for wanting an end to non-whites in the country and founder of the group White Revolution.

Results
Incumbent Mike Beebe won every county in Arkansas with between 52.10% and 85.44% of the votes.

Lieutenant governor
Incumbent Lieutenant Governor Bill Halter is ran for Senate and did not seek re-election as Lieutenant Governor.

Results

Secretary of State

Democratic incumbent Charlie Daniels was term-limited and instead he ran for State Auditor.

Attorney general

Incumbent Dustin McDaniel won every county in Arkansas with between 59.71% and 88.28% of the votes.

Treasurer

Incumbent Martha Shoffner won every county in Arkansas with between 53.43% and 87.67% of the votes.

Auditor of State

Democratic incumbent Jim Wood was term-limited.  Charlie Daniels won every county in Arkansas with between 58.52% and 88.51% of the votes.

Commissioner of State Lands

Democratic incumbent Commissioner Mark Wilcox was term-limited.

General Assembly

State Senate
Half of the 35 members of the Arkansas Senate were up for election in 2010.

State House of Representatives
All 100 seats in the Arkansas House of Representatives were up for election in 2010.

Judicial positions
Multiple judicial positions were up for election in 2010.
Arkansas judicial elections, 2010 at Judgepedia

Ballot measures
Three statewide ballot questions have been certified:
1. Right to hunt, fish and trap wildlife
2. Establish criteria before authorizing the issuance of bonds
3. Lower the threshold for issuing state bonds to attract major industries
Arkansas 2010 ballot measures at Ballotpedia

Results

Local
Many elections for county offices were also be held on November 2, 2010.

References

External links
Elections from the Arkansas Secretary of State
Candidates for Arkansas State Offices at Project Vote Smart
Arkansas Polls at Pollster.com

Arkansas Congressional Races in 2010 campaign finance data from OpenSecrets
Arkansas 2010 campaign finance data from Follow the Money
2010 Election at the Arkansas Democrat-Gazette

 
Arkansas